Saran district is one of the thirty-eight districts of Indian state of Bihar. The district, part of Saran Division, is also known as Chhapra district after the headquarters of the district, Chhapra.
It is considered as one of the richest Zamindari of Bihar after Raj Darbhanga, Hathwa Raj, Bettiah Raj and Raj Najarganj, Saran Raj.

Typonym 
It is said that "Saran" is a corrupted version of the word Sarangaranya (forest of Deers). According to legends,  earlier it was a dense forest full of Deers and home of Rishi Sarangi. Another suggestion is that the name is corruption of Sakra-aranya (the forest of Indra).

History
Chirand, 10 kilometres east of Chhapra, is a stratified Neolithic, Chalcolithic, and Iron Age settlement, which is known for its continuous archaeological record from the Neolithic age (about 2500–1345 BC) to the reign of the Pal dynasty who ruled during the pre-medieval period. The archaeological records suggest transitions in human habitation patterns in Chirand dating from 2500 BC to 30 AD.

Hathwa Raj was a Zamindar Dynasty in the Saran Division of Bihar belonging to Bhumihars, which encompassed 1,365 villages, was inhabited by more than 391,000 people, and produced an annual rental of almost a million rupees.

Hindi version of Saran Gazetteer titled as Srijan was released in September 2016.

Geography

The district of Saran is situated between 25°36' and 26°13' north latitude and 84°24' and 85°15' east longitude in the southern post of the Saran Division of North Bihar. The Ganges river provides the southern boundary of the district, beyond which lie the districts of Bhojpur and Patna. To the north of Saran lie the districts of Siwan and Gopalganj. The Gandak river forms the dividing line with the Vaishali and Muzaffarpur districts in the east. To the west of Saran lie the districts of Siwan and Balia in Uttar Pradesh. The Ghaghra river forms a natural boundary between Saran and Ballia.

The district is shaped like a triangle; its apex is the confluence of the boundary of the Gopalganj district and the GandakGanges river. The district is made up entirely of plains, but several depressions and marshes create three broad natural divisions:
 The alluvial plains along the big rivers, which are subject to periodic inundation.
 The uplands away from the rivers, not subject to floods.
 The riverbed diara areas.

India's biggest double-decker flyover is being constructed in Chhapra. It is longer than the  double-decker flyover in Santa Cruz–Chembur Link Road. Chief Minister Nitish Kumar laid the foundation stone of this double-decker flyover in July 2018, which is set to be completed by June 2022. The width of the flyover will be 5.5 meters. The double-decker flyover will be constructed from the eastern side of Bhikhari Thakur roundabout on NH- 19 crossing the Police Lines, Gandhi Chowk, Mouna Chowk, Nagarpalika (Rajendra) Chowk, bus stand and end at Daroga Rai Chowk near Zila school on the western side of Chhapra.

Politics 
  

|}

Economy
Saran was earlier called 'money order economy' district, as people used to send remittances in money order to their families there. It is one of the 38 districts in Bihar currently receiving funds from the Backward Regions Grant Fund Programme (BRGF).

It is a primarily agriculture based rural and suburban region with little industrial output. This can partly be attributed to the non business friendly socialism inspired governments led by RJD in the region from 2001 to 2014. That period was marked by unethical election practices.

Government
The present collector and District Magistrate of Saran is Rajesh Meena .
The Divisional Commissioner is Smt.Poonam(I.A.S).

The district has three Subdivisions, 20 Community Development Blocks and 1807 villages.

Subdivisions
Chhapra 
Marhowrah 
Sonpur

Blocks 

 Amnour
 Baniapur
 Chhapra
 Dariyapur
 Dighwara
 Ekma
 Garkha
 Ishupur
 Jalalpur
 Lahladpur
 Maker
 Manjhi
 Marhaura
 Mashrakh
 Nagra
 Panapur
 Parsa
 Revelganj
 Sonpur
 Taraiya

Demographics

According to the 2011 census Saran district has a population of 3,951,862, roughly equal to the nation of Liberia or the US state of Oregon. This gives it a ranking of 60th in India (out of a total of 640). Its population growth rate over the decade 2001-2011 was  21.37%. Saran has a sex ratio of 949 females for every 1000 males, and a literacy rate of 68.57%. 8.94% of the population lives in urban areas.

 Population: Total: 3951862 Rural: 3598660 Urban: 35883
 SC Population: Total: 474066 (12.00%) Rural: 438183 Urban: 24089
 ST Population: Total: 36786 (0.93%) Rural: 35885 Urban: 901

Languages

At the time of the 2011 Census of India, 93.16% of the population in the district spoke Bhojpuri, 4.45% Hindi and 2.28% Urdu as their first language.

Languages include Bhojpuri, a tongue in the Bihari language group with almost 40 million speakers, written in both the Devanagari and Kaithi scripts.

Transport

The nearest airport to Saran District is Lok Nayak Jayaprakash Airport in Patna, approximately 74 kilometres (46 mi) away.

Notable personalities

 Dr. Rajendra Prasad
 Jayaprakash Narayan
 Bhikhari Thakur
 Chitragupt (composer)
 Anand–Milind
 Abdul Ghafoor
 Lachhimi Sakhi
 Pandey Kapil
 Ram Dulari Sinha
Ramchandra Manjhi
Dharni Das

References

External links 
 Official website
Saran Information Portal

 
Saran division
1976 establishments in Bihar
Districts of Bihar